Meerut South Assembly constituency is one of the 403 constituencies of the Uttar Pradesh Legislative Assembly, India. It is a part of the Meerut district and one of the five assembly constituencies in the Meerut Lok Sabha constituency. First election in this assembly constituency was held in 2012 after the "Delimitation of Parliamentary and Assembly Constituencies Order, 2008" was passed and the constituency was constituted in 2008. The constituency is assigned identification number 49.

Wards / Areas
Extent of Meerut South Assembly constituency is KC Meerut, & Ward Nos. 2, 3, 5, 10, 11, 13, 16, 19, 25, 28, 30, 31, 33, 34, 35, 39, 41 & 46 in Meerut (M Corp.) of Meerut Tehsil.

Members of the Legislative Assembly

Election results

2022 

 

>

2017

2012

See also
Meerut district
Meerut Lok Sabha constituency
Sixteenth Legislative Assembly of Uttar Pradesh
Uttar Pradesh Legislative Assembly

References

External links
 

Assembly constituencies of Uttar Pradesh
Politics of Meerut district
Constituencies established in 2008
2008 establishments in Uttar Pradesh